Bourges Airport  is an airport serving Bourges, a commune in the Cher department of the Centre-Val de Loire region of France.

Facilities

Statistics

References

External links
 

Airports in Centre-Val de Loire
Buildings and structures in Cher (department)
Transport in Centre-Val de Loire
Bourges